Paragomphus lineatus, Lined hooktail, is a species of dragonfly in the family Gomphidae. It is a widespread species; recorded from India to Turkey.

Description and habitat
It is a black and yellow dragonfly with bluish grey eyes. Its thorax is yellow, marked with  blackish-brown stripes. There is a black dorsal line bordering the mesothoraoic collar on either side of the mid-dorsal carina and an oblique antehumeral line to join this line in its upper part, thus enclosing a thin stripe of the yellow colour. There is a line on the humeral suture and two lateral lines close together on the postero-lateral suture. Abdomen is black marked with yellow basal rings. Segment 1 has the sides broadly yellow and a large dorsal apical spot. Segment 2 has a sub-dorsal black line on each side enclosing a dorsal yellow spot. Segments 3 to 7 have broad black apical rings. There is a lateral black line runs from the apical ring on each
side and extends to the yellow base. Segments 8 and 9 have wide dilatations at their sides. They are black on the dorsum except for a fine basal rings. Segment 10 is yellow, with black on the basal half of the dorsum. Anal appendages are yellow and hood-shaped. Female is similar to the male; but lacks the dilatations on the last abdominal segments.

It is commonly found near streams, rivers, ponds and lakes where it breeds.

See also
 List of odonates of India
 List of odonata of Kerala

References

Gomphidae
Insects described in 1850